Monfalcone (archaic ) is a town and comune of the province of Gorizia in Friuli Venezia Giulia, northern Italy, located on the Gulf of Trieste. Monfalcone means 'falcon mountain' in Italian (see Montfaucon in French and Falkenberg in Germanic languages).

It is a major industrial centre for manufacturing ships, airplanes, textiles, chemicals, and refined oil, and the home of the Fincantieri cruise ship building company. Monfalcone is the northernmost city on the Mediterranean Sea.

Geography

Monfalcone is the fifth most populous town in Friuli Venezia Giulia and the main centre of Bisiacaria territory. Joined to its neighbourhoods, it has about 50,000 inhabitants. The town lies between the Karst hills and the Adriatic coast, and it is the northernmost port of the Mediterranean Sea.

History 
In prehistoric times the area of Monfalcone housed several fortified villages called castellieri. After the foundation of the Roman city of Aquileia (181 BC), some thermal buildings were created on the hills, known as Insulae Clarae.

After Ostrogoth, Byzantine, Lombard, and Frankish domination, Monfalcone was controlled by the Patriarchs of Aquileia starting from 967. The Venetians conquered it in 1420 after three days of siege, keeping it until 1511, when it fell to the French. Conquered back by Venice, it was ravaged by the troops of Habsburg Emperor Maximilian I in 1513, who destroyed the Rocca fortress. In 1521 it was returned to the Republic of Venice, under which it remained until its dissolution by the 1797 Treaty of Campo Formio. 

From 1805 it was controlled by the French Empire until the fall of Napoleon in 1814, after which it was included in the Kingdom of Illyria, part of the Austrian Empire. Incorporated into the crown land of Gorizia and Gradisca, it belonged to the Austrian Littoral from 1849. The first shipyards arose from about 1908 onwards, among them the Cantiere Navale Triestino company building steamships for the Austro-Americana Line based in Trieste. During World War I, the town was captured by Italian forces in 1915 and became the rear line during the bloody Battles of the Isonzo, being briefly recaptured by Austria-Hungary after the 1917 Battle of Caporetto, but returning to Italy in 1918. The shipyards were severely damaged by bitter fighting and had to be rebuilt afterwards. During World War II the town was repeatedly bombed and heavily damaged, became a center of the Italian Resistance after the Armistice of Cassibile, and it was briefly occupied by Yugoslav troops at the end of the war.

Main sights
 Rocca fortress. Of medieval origin (according to a legend, it was founded by Theoderic the Great, King of the Ostrogoths), its current appearance dates to Venetian restorations in the early 16th century. The interior houses a speleology exhibition.
 World War I Park
Karst area
 Saint Ambrose's Cathedral
 Roman villas and thermae: Several remains of Roman villas have been found on the territory of the municipality of Monfalcone. The sites are object of archaeological research but are not open to public. A thermae dating back to the Roman era is also present and what remains of the ancient edifice is now included in the current thermal establishment that was reactivated in 2014.

Transport
Monfalcone railway station, opened in 1860, is a junction between the Venice–Trieste railway and the Udine–Trieste railway.

The construction and design records of the ships produced in Monfalcone Shipyard Number 1 from 1909 - 1967 have been preserved in the Fondo Egone Missio Archives (Egone Missio Archives).

People

 Enrico Toti (1882–1916), cyclist, was killed in the Sixth Battle of the Isonzo in Monfalcone
 Antonio Sant'Elia (1888–1916), architect, was killed in the Eighth Battle of the Isonzo in Monfalcone
 Filippo Zappata (1894–1994), engineer, worked in Monfalcone
 Mirko Gruden (1911–1967), footballer
 Gino Paoli (born 1934), singer-songwriter
 Paolo Rossi (born 1953), actor
 Stefano Zoff (born 1966), boxer
 Mo-Do (Fabio Frittelli; 1966–2013), musician
 Elisa Toffoli (born 1977), singer-songwriter, grew up in Monfalcone
 Massimiliano Versace (born 1972), scientist

International relations

 
Monfalcone is twinned with:
 Neumarkt in Steiermark, Austria
 Gallipoli, Italy
 Karadeniz Ereğli, Turkey
 Zonguldak, Turkey

References

External links
Official website